4DTV is a proprietary broadcasting standard and technology for digital cable broadcasting and C-band/Ku-band satellite dishes from Motorola, using General Instrument's DigiCipher II for encryption. It can tune in both analog VideoCipher 2 and digital DCII satellite channels.

History 
4DTV technology was originally developed in 1997 (the same year that DigiCipher was developed) by General Instrument/NextLevel and Motorola, now a division of ARRIS. The 4DTV format is contemporary to the DVB-based digital television broadcast standard but its completion came before that of DVB and thus it is similar but incompatible with the DVB standard. The DigiCipher 2 encryption system is used in digital channels much like the VideoCipher and VideoCipher II systems were used for analog encrypted transmissions. By the time when analogue VideoCipher II channels are switched to digital, all of the remaining VCII-encrypted channels (excluding in the clear) are transitioned to DigiCipher II on all satellites that carries either in the clear or VideoCipher II/II+/RS-encrypted channels. On December 31, 2010, Motorola abandoned support for 4DTV after 13 years when it was developed. This made all of the receivers to redirect to AMC-18 (also known as W5/X4 on the 4DTV system) instead of its of other satellites that carries analog/VCII channels.

On August 24, 2016, at 9:18 AM EST, Headend In The Sky (the provider for 4DTV/DigiCipher II programming) transitioned to DVB-S2 (MPEG-2/256 QAM), meaning that support for 4DTV ended on that date.

Technical specifications

Usage 
4DTV is designed for C-band/Ku-band based satellite dishes (both TVRO/direct-broadcast) in conjunction with the DigiCipher II system (for digital standard definition/high definition signals) and the VideoCipher II system (for analog signals). It is also used on Canada's Shaw Direct (previously known as Star Choice) until 2017 when standard definition broadcasting ended in favour of HDTV exclusively, making the receivers obsolete.

Receiver/Decoders 
4DTV receivers were designed to receive analog NTSC (except the DSR-905) in the clear or VideoCipherII channels and feeds, as well as digital Digicipher 2 channels as a TVRO satellite system on both C and Ku band-powered satellite dishes.

Four models are available, either new or refurbished:
DSR-920 (discontinued as of 2003)
DSR-921 (discontinued as of 2003)
DSR-922 (made available in Fall 2000, discontinued) 
DSR-905 (designed to work with analog 4DTV receivers and it can only receive DigiCipher II channels) (discontinued)

High definition access 
The HDD-200 is a peripheral for 4DTV, it is used to access high definition channels via the Mult-Media Access Port. This peripheral is no longer in production.

Programming providers 

In the United States, National Programming Service, LLC (NPS) was the primary provider of subscription programming to 4DTV and C band/Ku band users. They ceased operations as of December 26, 2010 after making a controversial attempt of converting all of their customers over to Dish Network which failed. The largest providers are now Satellite Receivers, Ltd. (SRL) and Skyvision who sell programming from the Headend In The Sky (HITS) service by Comcast and will continue to do so in 2011 and beyond. The HITS services use the Comcast Subscription Authorization Center (SAC) for the channels being broadcast on the AMC 18 satellite located at 105 degrees West (W5 or X4 tile on 4DTV). In Canada, Dr. Sat is now the primary provider for HITS subscription services offered on C-Band after Satellite Communications Source ceased operations.

Due to the removal of 4DTV/DigiCipher II channels on August 24, 2016, there are no more programming providers for the 4DTV in the United States and Canada. However, Shaw Direct still offers DigiCipher II programming in Canada, but not HITS programming.

Advantages 
The 4DTV makes use of first-generation digital master feeds on several satellites and hundreds of channels. Therefore, a high quality signal is received, compared to other programming options that are typically compressed and re-uplinked. Being a C-band system, the 4DTV has the advantage of signal stability, great satellite footprint and no rainfade. This is a problem with services such as Dish Network and DirecTV satellite providers since they re-uplink on Ku and Ka bands.

Disadvantages 
The master feeds for the many channels available can be scattered amongst multiple satellites. The actuator must slowly rotate the large dish into the desired satellite's signal path, and then a further short delay for signal acquisition and lock. This procedure makes rapid "channel surfing" impossible outside the HITS provided channels.

References

1997 introductions
Telecommunications-related introductions in 1997
Audiovisual introductions in 1997
Products and services discontinued in 2010
Products and services discontinued in 2016
Digital television
Motorola products